Valeri Yevgenievich Karpov (5 August 1971 – 10 October 2014) was an ice hockey player who played in the Soviet Hockey League and National Hockey League.  He competed for Traktor Chelyabinsk and HC CSKA Moscow in Russia before moving to North America.  He was drafted 56th overall by the Mighty Ducks of Anaheim in the 1993 NHL Entry Draft and joined the team the next season, but struggled to maintain a place in the Ducks roster, bouncing around the minor leagues.  He played 76 regular season games for the Ducks over three seasons, scoring 14 goals and 15 assists for 29 points, collecting 32 penalty minutes.  He returned to Russia in 1997, spending three seasons with Metallurg Magnitogorsk, helping them win the RSL title in 1999.  After spells with HC Lada Togliatti and HC Dynamo Moscow, he returned to Metallurg Magnitogorsk in 2001, where he stayed for another four years. He was inducted into the Russian and Soviet Hockey Hall of Fame in 1993 and retired in 2005.

In the summer of 2014, during a brawl in his house he took a hit to the head and had a bad fall that resulted in a coma. He underwent two trepanning surgeries, but did not regain consciousness and died on 10 October 2014.

Career statistics

Regular season and playoffs

International

References

External links
 
 Russian and Soviet Hockey Hall of Fame bio

1971 births
2014 deaths
Anaheim Ducks draft picks
Baltimore Bandits players
HC CSKA Moscow players
HC Dynamo Moscow players
HC Lada Togliatti players
HC Mechel players
Ice hockey players at the 1994 Winter Olympics
Long Beach Ice Dogs (IHL) players
Metallurg Magnitogorsk players
Mighty Ducks of Anaheim players
Olympic ice hockey players of Russia
Russian ice hockey right wingers
San Diego Gulls (IHL) players
Soviet ice hockey right wingers
Sportspeople from Chelyabinsk
Traktor Chelyabinsk players